Diana Henry may refer to:

 Diana Henry (food writer) (born 1963), British food writer
 Diana Mara Henry (born 1948), American photographer and photojournalist
 Di Henry, a fictional character in the American TV series All My Children